The Sri Varadharaja Perumal Temple in Tirunelveli, Tamil Nadu India is a Hindu temple dedicated to Lord Vishnu.

Temple
Sri Varadharaja Perumal temple is situated in a small town called Tirunelveli, found at the southern end of Tamil Nadu. This temple is an ancient and reputed Vishnu temple. It lies on the banks of the perennial river Thamarabarani. This area is also known as Veeraraghavapuram, which is the hoary name of this place. It has been named after Veeraraghavan, the main and preceding deity (Moolavar), in Sri Varadharaja Temple. Sri Varadharaja perumal is the Usthava Moorthy. The temple is called on his name.

Legend
Few centuries back, a king by name Krishnavarma was ruling over this part of Tirunelveli. He held this region as his capital. He was a staunch devotee of Varadharaja perumal. He always used to pray Lord Varadharaja Perumal enthroned in his palace and chant the name of Lord Sri Rama. Observing the deep piety of this king, the neighbouring king utilized the chance to attack him. Legend says Lord Rama saved Krishnavarma from his foe. Lord appeared before king Krishnavarma as 'Veeraraghavan', the embodiment of bravery and valour. Deeply moved by the divine vision, the king sang a few slogans in praise of the Lord as stated in Thamirabarani Mahatmiyam (Ch:16-17 ).

King Krishnavarma felt happy and constructed a temple for Lord Veeraraghavan to show his gratitude. He formed a city called Veeraraghavapuram around it and also called Veeraragha Theertha Kattam in river Thamirabrani, which flows as uthiravahini (towards north) in this kshetram. Hence this area holds the name Veeraraghavapuram.

Darshan, Sevas and Festivals
It is a matter of pride that there is a close connection between Sri Varadharaja perumal temple, Tirunelveli and Sri Vanamamalai Mutt, Nanguneri. Even now, in this temple the first and the foremost honour and respect are given to H.H. Vanamamalai Jeer swamigal.

Shrines
This celebrated temple, at present has separate shrines for Sudharsanar with Yoga Narasimar at the back, Garudar, Krishnar, Vikshwasenar, Adhiseshan, Alwars. Two separate shrines are situated for Sri Vedhavalli Thayar and Sri Perundevi Thayar. Vaiganasa Agamam is being followed here.

Rajagopuram
Five tiers Rajagopuram was successfully built and also big mahamandapam with four giant saptaswara pillars was built by replacing the old 16 pillars mandapam the samprokshana took place on 29 May 2013 Wednesday. Thousands of devotees were witnessed it.

Poojas
Regular pujas (Visvarupam, Kalasanthi, Uchikalam, Sayarakshai and Thiruvisagam) are performed daily. Pujas are performed as per "Sri Vaikanasa baghavat sastra". Every day the moolavar get bathed from the holy tamirabarani water.

Brahmam Uthsavam
Brahmamosthavam is celebrated for 10 days during the Tamil of Chitarai (Mid of April to Mid of May) ending on Thiruvona Nakshatram for Chakrasnanam. On 5th day  5 Garauda sevai (iyendhu garudasevai) festival takes place with four other deities on their Garudavahanam from the neighbouring temples (Sri Srinivasa perumal, Sri Kariayamanika perumal, Sri Lakshmi Narasima perumal and Sri Rajagopala perumal).  
Car festival is celebrated on the 9th day.

New car (ratham) samarpanam
A new car (ratham) was built and it has been offered to Lord Varadharaja swamy by Sri Lakshmi Vallabha trust with the help of public at May 2015 chitrai brahmosthavam. The car (ratham) is 32 feet height and 13 feet breadth with nearly 350 teak wood carvings and has 52 chiming bells in it. A shed is under construction to secure the ratham.

Athyayana Uthsavam
Athyayana Uthsavam is celebrated for 21 days. Usthavar is adorned in different thirukolams (decorations). Nalayara Dhivya Prabandham is chanted on all these 21 days and on the 21st day is the Vaigunda Ekadesi festival is completed by performing Veedupadi veedu. On the day of Vaigunda Ekadesi the Usthavar is adorned in sayanakolam. That evening Sorgavasal festival is celebrated.

Other Uthsavam
Hanuman Jayanthi festival is celebrated for 10days during Marhazi ending on Moola Nakshatram (Amavasya) with Pushpanjali. 7 days of Thailiakappu utsavam for Thayar in margazhi,7 days of Pavithrothsavam in the month of Aavani, All Saturdays of the Tamil month Purratasi are celebrated with Garudaseva. Navarathri also celebrated in the same month. Five days of Unjal utsavam starts with deepavali.  In Karthigai month "Sokkapanai" festival celebrated on the full moon day. Alwar thirunakhsatrams and related Uthsavams are celebrated regularly every year.

External links
 Sri Varadaraja Perumal – Tirunelveli

Tirunelveli
Vishnu temples